Han Xinyun and Ye Qiuyu were the defending champions, but they lost in the first round to Shérazad Reix and Ayano Shimizu.

Dalila Jakupović and Irina Khromacheva won the title after defeating Guo Hanyu and Sun Xuliu 6–1, 6–1 in the final.

Seeds

Draw

Draw

References
Main Draw

Kunming Open - Doubles